is a professional wrestling event promoted by New Japan Pro-Wrestling (NJPW). 

The event was established in 2015 and took place in late April between the larger Invasion Attack and Wrestling Dontaku events. The event was held in Mashiki, Kumamoto and its name referred to the nickname of Kumamoto Prefecture, . The 2016 event was canceled due to the 2016 Kumamoto earthquakes. In 2017, the event was replaced by Wrestling Toyonokuni, taking place in Beppu, Ōita. Wrestling Hinokuni returned in 2018 two years later after the 2016 Kumamoto earthquakes.

Production
The Wrestling Hinokuni events featured professional wrestling matches that involved different wrestlers from pre-existing scripted feuds and storylines. Wrestlers portray villains, heroes, or less distinguishable characters in the scripted events that built tension and culminated in a wrestling match or series of matches.

Events

2015

The first Wrestling Hinokuni took place on April 29, 2015, at the Grand Messe Kumamoto in Mashiki, Kumamoto, and aired worldwide on NJPW World. The event featured nine matches, three of which were contested for championships. Wrestlers representing the National Wrestling Alliance (NWA) took part in the event with both the NWA World Heavyweight and NWA World Junior Heavyweight Championships being defended. In the first title match, NWA representative Steve Anthony successfully defended the NWA World Junior Heavyweight Championship against NJPW's Jyushin Thunder Liger. This was a rematch from a match in Las Vegas earlier in the month, where Anthony also defeated Liger to capture the title. The second title match saw NJPW's Hiroyoshi Tenzan make his second successful defense of the NWA World Heavyweight Championship against NWA's Big Daddy Yum-Yum. Several matches at the event also built to matches taking place at Wrestling Dontaku 2015 the following week. One of these matches saw Bullet Club's Doc Gallows, Karl Anderson and Kenny Omega defeat Alex Shelley, Tetsuya Naito and Tomoaki Honma in a six-man tag team match in the buildup to an IWGP Junior Heavyweight Championship match between champion Omega and challenger Shelley.

Another match built to the main event of Wrestling Dontaku 2015, which would see Hirooki Goto challenge Shinsuke Nakamura for the IWGP Intercontinental Championship. At Wrestling Hinokuni 2015, Nakamura, Kazushi Sakuraba and Toru Yano defeated Goto, Hiroshi Tanahashi and Katsuyori Shibata. In the main event of the show, Tomohiro Ishii defended the NEVER Openweight Championship against Togi Makabe. This was a rematch from January's Wrestle Kingdom 9 in Tokyo Dome, where Makabe defeated Ishii to become the new NEVER Openweight Champion. However, on February 14, Makabe was stripped of the title after he was forced to pull out of a scheduled rematch with Ishii due to influenza, which led to Ishii defeating Tomoaki Honma to recapture the now vacant title. The main event saw Makabe again defeat Ishii to win the NEVER Openweight Championship for the second time.

2016

Wrestling Hinokuni 2016 is a canceled professional wrestling event that was scheduled to take place on April 29, 2016, at the Grand Messe Kumamoto in Mashiki, Kumamoto. The event was set to feature nine matches, three of which were to be contested for championships. The event was to be headlined by Kenny Omega making his first defense of the IWGP Intercontinental Championship against Michael Elgin. This was set up earlier in the month at Invasion Attack 2016, where the two had a heated confrontation after Elgin, Hiroshi Tanahashi and Yoshitatsu had defeated Omega and The Young Bucks (Matt Jackson and Nick Jackson) to win the NEVER Openweight 6-Man Tag Team Championship. Another title match was set to continue a storyline, where Katsuyori Shibata defended the NEVER Openweight Championship against NJPW veterans, known as the "third generation". Having already defended the title against Satoshi Kojima, at Invasion Attack 2016, Shibata successfully defended the title against Hiroyoshi Tenzan and afterwards kicked Yuji Nagata to set him up as his next challenger. The two had previously faced off in August 2014 during the 2014 G1 Climax tournament, where Nagata defeated Shibata.

The event was also scheduled to feature a rematch from Invasion Attack 2016, where the new IWGP Junior Heavyweight Tag Team Champions, Roppongi Vice (Beretta and Rocky Romero), would defend the title against previous champions, Matt Sydal and Ricochet. One of the big non-title matches at Wrestling Hinokuni was set to continue the rivalry between the Chaos and Los Ingobernables de Japón stables as the former's Hirooki Goto, Kazuchika Okada, Tomohiro Ishii and Will Ospreay were set to take on the latter's Bushi, Evil, Sanada and Tetsuya Naito. This match would also build up three matches taking place at Wrestling Dontaku 2016, where Goto was set to take on Evil, Okada take on Sanada and Ishii challenge Naito for the IWGP Heavyweight Championship.

On April 14, Kumamoto was hit with an earthquake, which led to NJPW announcing that they were trying to determine whether they could continue going forward with the show. After another earthquake two days later, NJPW officially canceled the show on April 18. Top matches from the event were later moved to the April 27 Road to Wrestling Dontaku 2016 and May 3 Wrestling Dontaku 2016 events.

2018

Wrestling Hinokuni 2018 was a professional wrestling event took place on April 29, 2018, at the Grand Messe Kumamoto in Mashiki, Kumamoto. This event makes the return of New Japan Pro Wrestling to Mashiki, Kumamoto after two years.

2019

Wrestling Hinokuni 2019 was a professional wrestling event that took place on April 29, 2019, at the Grand Messe Kumamoto in Mashiki, Kumamoto. This event makes the return of New Japan Pro Wrestling to Mashiki, Kumamoto after two years.

References

External links
The official New Japan Pro-Wrestling website

New Japan Pro-Wrestling shows
2015 in professional wrestling
2016 in professional wrestling
Entertainment events in Japan